Smoother was a Canadian rock band from Hamilton, Ontario, headed by lead vocalist, guitarist, and songwriter Andrew Franey.  Members included Beau Cook on bass and vocals, keyboardist James Flemings-Strange, drummer Adam Benning and Todd Knight on guitar and vocals.

History
Smoother started out with the name Sponge; They signed with Sonic Unyon and recorded an album, Trendbender, in cassette form in 1993 under that name.  The band also contributed to a Sonic Union compilation album, Not if I Smell You First.

The band changed its name to Smoother after the American band with the same name began to achieve success in North America. They then released an album, Copycat in 1994 through Sonic Unyon.

Smoother performed at the NXNE festival and Edgefest in 2001. The band's first and only major label release, Chasing the Dragon, was released in 2001 through EMI Canada. The album was well received critically but failed to meet the sales expectations of EMI. The single "East Side" received extensive radio play in Canada, and was among the top 70 most played radio tracks in Canada in 2001. The music video for "East Side" reached number 12 on the Much Top 30 Countdown in September 2001. "East Side" was also featured in the motion picture Men With Brooms. The band was nominated for Best New Group at the 2002 Juno Awards.

Discography

Studio albums
Trendbender (as Sponge) (1993, Sonic Unyon)
 Copycat (1994, Sonic Unyon)
 What a Life (1999, Sonic Unyon)
 Chasing the Dragon (2001, EMI Music Canada)

Singles
 "Electroconfusion" (2000)
 "East Side" (2001)

References

Canadian alternative rock groups
Musical groups from Hamilton, Ontario
Sonic Unyon artists